Paul Martin Scarr (born 20 August 1969) is an Australian politician and lawyer who was elected as a Senator for Queensland at the 2019 federal election. He is a member of the Liberal National Party of Queensland and sits with the Liberal Party in federal parliament.

Early life
Scarr was born in Sydney on 20 August 1969, the son of Diane Berry and David Scarr. He moved to Queensland with his family at the age of seven, attending Ipswich Grammar School. He went on to complete the degrees of Bachelor of Laws (Hons.) and Bachelor of Commerce at the University of Queensland.

Career
Scarr served his articles of clerkship at Allens in Brisbane, before joining the firm as a solicitor in 1994. He was a senior associate with the firm's Papua New Guinea division from 1999 to 2001. After returning to Australia he joined King & Wood Mallesons in 2005. In 2007, Scarr was appointed general counsel and company secretary of PanAust Limited, an Australian company with mining operations in Laos.

Politics
Scarr joined the Liberal Party in 1987 and held office in the Young Liberals. He was chairman of the party's Hawken Drive (St Lucia) branch from 1997 to 1999. Following the creation of the Liberal National Party of Queensland he served on the electorate councils for the state seats of Indooroopilly and Miller and the federal seat of Moreton.

In July 2018, Scarr won LNP preselection as the lead candidate on the party's Senate ticket in Queensland. The results of the ballot saw incumbent senators Ian Macdonald and Barry O'Sullivan lose their previous positions on the ticket.

At the 2019 federal election, Scarr was elected to a six-year term beginning on 1 July 2019. He has served on various Senate committees, including as chair of the economics references and the legal and constitutional affairs references committees. In July 2022, following the Coalition's defeat at the 2022 federal election, Scarr was appointed as a deputy opposition whip.

Positions
In March 2021, Scarr was identified by the Sydney Morning Herald as a member of the Centre-Right faction of the Liberal Party.

References

Liberal Party of Australia members of the Parliament of Australia
Members of the Australian Senate
Members of the Australian Senate for Queensland
Living people
Liberal National Party of Queensland politicians
1969 births
Company secretaries
Australian lawyers
University of Queensland alumni